Baptist Noel, 3rd Earl of Gainsborough (1684 – 17 April 1714) was an English peer and Member of Parliament.

Early life
Baptist Noel was born in 1684. He was the son of Baptist Noel and cousin of Wriothesley Noel, 2nd Earl of Gainsborough.

Career
Noel inherited the earldom from his cousin in 1690. He served as the High Steward of Chipping Campden.

Personal life
Noel married his first cousin Lady Dorothy Manners, daughter of Catherine Wriothesley Noel (daughter of Baptist Noel, 3rd Viscount Campden) and John Manners, 1st Duke of Rutland. They had three sons and three daughters:

Baptist Noel, 4th Earl of Gainsborough (1708-1751)
John Noel (died 1718)
James Noel (died 1752), MP for the county of Rutland, who died unmarried
Lady Susan(nah) Noel (1710-1758), who married Anthony Ashley-Cooper, 4th Earl of Shaftesbury, and had no children
Lady Catherine Noel, who died unmarried
Lady Mary Noel (died 1718)

Death and legacy
The earl died of smallpox, aged 29, on 17 April 1714, and was succeeded by his eldest son.

References

1684 births
1714 deaths
Earls of Gainsborough (1682 creation)
Baptist